CIOB may stand for the following:

Chartered Institute of Building, United Kingdom
Chemin de Fer Impérial Ottoman de Baghdad — The Baghdad Railway
Central Indian Ocean Basin, an abyssal plain